According to the memoirs of Nikita Khrushchev, the deputy premier Lavrentiy Beria (1946–1953) pressed Joseph Stalin to claim eastern Anatolian territory that had supposedly been stolen from Georgia by the Turks. For practical reasons, the Soviet claims, if successful, would have strengthened the state's position around the Black Sea and would weaken British influence in the Middle East.

Background  
The Soviet Union had long objected to the Montreux Convention of 1936 which gave Turkey sole control over shipping between the Bosphorus strait, an essential waterway for Russian exports. When the 1925 Soviet-Turkish Treaty of Friendship and Neutrality expired in 1945, the Soviet side chose not to renew the treaty. The Soviet foreign minister Vyacheslav Molotov told the Turks that Georgian and Armenian claims to Turkish-controlled territory would have to be resolved before the conclusion of a new treaty.

The disputed territory around Kars and Ardahan was governed by the Russian Empire from 1878 to 1921, when it was ceded to Turkey by Russia but continued to be inhabited by members of the respective ethnies who now had titular Soviet Socialist Republics. Molotov argued that while the Soviets normalized their border with Poland since territorial cessions to the country during Soviet weakness in 1921, similar cessions to Turkey were never legitimized by renegotiation since that time.

Claims  
in 1945, 14–20 December, central Georgian and Russian newspapers: Communist, Zarya Vostoka, Pravda and Izvestia, published letter on our legitimate claim against Turkey written by academics Simon Janashia and Niko Berdzenishvili. the publication says:

The last section of the report was devoted to Lazistan, or Chanetia. Borders of this territory start from the borders of the Batumi province and further to the west along the Black Sea coast to Termedon River near the town of Terme. This territory occupies approximately 20,000 km2. and embraces the capes of Rize, Trabzon, Fici, and Fener. Note that medieval wars with Byzantium and events of the eleventh to thirteenth centuries found their parallel in the report. Finally, the report implied that "Georgian SSR, besides the southern sector of the former Batumi district and former Artvin, Ardahan and Olti districts, could lay claim to its historical provinces, including Parhal, Tortom and İspir (South-Western Metskhetia) and the East Chanetia (region of Rize) and the Central Chanetia (region of Trebizond).

Plans  
There were three Soviet plans concerning the amount of territory that Turkey should cede:
The First plan included the territory of former Russian Empire Oblast of  Kars, Batum and Surmali uyezd of Erivan Governorate (city of Iğdır and surroundings) that were part of the Russian Empire from 1878 until 1918, then part of the Republic of Armenia (1918–1920) and Democratic Republic of Georgia in 1918–1921.
The Second plan included the Georgian SSR claims along Choroh river and eastern Lazistan. Armenian SSR claims on Alashkert (city of Bayazet added to Kars and Surmali).
The Third plan included most of Black sea region of Turkey (Trabzon, Gumushane and Giresun districts along Terme River and most eastern part of Anatolia  (Erzurum, Van, Mush, Bitlis).

The Soviet government wanted to repatriate those from the Armenian diaspora in the acquired territories, since in three years (1946–1948) after the World War II about 150,000 ethnic Armenians (Western Armenians and their descendants) from Syria, Lebanon, Greece, Bulgaria, Romania, Cyprus, Palestine, Iraq, Egypt, and France had migrated to Soviet Armenia.

Failure  
Strategically, the United States opposed Soviet annexation of the Kars Plateau for its necessity to defend Turkey. Ideologically, certain elements in the American government saw the Soviet territorial claims as expansionist and reminiscent of Nazi irredentism over the Sudeten Germans in Czechoslovakia. Since 1934, the State Department had concluded that its earlier support for Armenia since President Wilson (1913-1921) had expired since the loss of Armenian independence.

The United States' firm opposition to Soviet-backed separatist movements in Turkey and Persia led to the crushing and re-annexation of the Kurdish Republic of Mahabad (1946–1947) and Azeri Azerbaijan People's Government (1945–1946) by Persia. Turkey joined the anti-Soviet military alliance NATO in 1952. Following the death of Stalin in 1953, the Soviet government renounced its territorial claims on Turkey, as part of an effort to promote friendly relations with the transcontinental country and its alliance partner, the United States.

See also
 Armenia–Turkey border
 Azerbaijan–Turkey border
 Basmachi movement
 Georgia–Turkey border
 Pan-Turkism
 Russo-Turkish War (1877–78)
 Treaty of Kars, 1921
 Turkish Straits crisis

References

History of Turkey
Aftermath of World War II in the Soviet Union
Territorial disputes of the Soviet Union
Territorial disputes of Turkey
Soviet Union–Turkey border
Soviet Union–Turkey relations